Richard Porter (July 26, 1965January 3, 1990), better known as Rich Porter, was an Afro-American drug dealer who rose to prominence in the Harlem neighborhood of New York City during the crack era in the mid–1980s. Porter was described by the police as being a "mid-level crack dealer" who "sold about $50 thousand worth of crack a week". The 2002 film Paid in Full was based on Rich and his partners Azie Faison and Alpo Martinez.

Life
Born Richard Porter in the Harlem section of New York City, Porter was the oldest of three children born to Velma Porter. Porter began selling drugs at the age of 12, rising through the ranks of the drug trade in Harlem. He became known for his flamboyant and high-profile lifestyle. He was rumored to have never worn the same outfit twice and that he owned over a dozen luxury vehicles that he kept in a garage in Manhattan during the height of his career as a drug dealer.

Death
Rich Porter was murdered on January 3, 1990, and his body was found in the vicinity of Orchard Beach, Bronx the following day. Porter had been shot several times in the head and chest and at the time of his death police found $2,239 in his pocket. Porter's friend and former drug dealing partner Alpo Martinez was charged with the murder and was later convicted.

On December 5, 1989, Porter's 12-year-old brother Donnell Porter was kidnapped in Harlem on his way to school. The kidnappers cut Donnell's finger off in order to extort $500,000, later lowered to $350,000, in ransom money from Rich. Donnell was eventually killed and his body was found on January 28, 1990, a mile away from where Rich's body was found, less than one month after Rich's murder. Donnell and Rich's maternal uncle Johnny “Apple” Porter was found to be responsible for Donnell's kidnapping and murder.

In popular culture
The 2002 film Paid in Full was based on the life and death of Rich, and his involvement in drug dealing along with Azie Faison and Alpo Martinez. His character was portrayed by fellow Harlem native Mekhi Phifer. Richard Porter and the kidnapping and murder of his 12-year-old brother are also the subject of an episode of the FBI Files (Season 03, Episode 18) "The C-11 Squad".

References

1965 births
1990 deaths
American drug traffickers
African-American gangsters
American gangsters
Murdered American gangsters
People murdered by African-American organized crime
People from Harlem
Criminals from Manhattan
Gangsters from New York City
People murdered in New York City
Male murder victims
Deaths by firearm in the Bronx
20th-century African-American people